Priya Arun-Berde (born 30 July 1970) is an Indian actress who has worked in several Marathi-language films. She is the wife of the actor Laxmikant Berde and is the daughter of actress Lata Arun.

Filmography

Television

References

External links 
 
 Abhinay Berde Family

1967 births
20th-century Indian actresses
21st-century Indian actresses
Indian film actresses
Living people
Marathi actors